Gooding is an English surname. Notable people with the surname include:

Caroline Gooding (1959–2014), British solicitor and activist for individuals with disabilities
Cuba Gooding Sr. (1944–2017), American soul singer
Cuba Gooding Jr. (born 1968), American actor and son of Cuba Gooding Sr.
Omar Gooding (born 1976), American actor and son of Cuba Gooding Sr.
Cynthia Gooding (1924–1988), American folk singer 
David Gooding (1947–2009), British academic
Frank R. Gooding (1859–1928), American politician
Hattie B. Gooding (1877 - 1938), American publicity agent
Jason Gooding (born 1979), Trinidadian triathlete
Mick Gooding (born 1959), British footballer

English-language surnames